The National Defence University of Warsaw ( – AON) was the civil-military highest defence academic institution in Poland, located in Warszawa–Rembertów. In 2016 it was succeeded by the War Studies University.

The National Defence University in Warsaw was established on 1 October 1990 after reform of the General Staff Academy (est. 1947) and continued traditions of the Szkoła Rycerska ("The School of Knights") founded on 15 March 1765 and other subsequent military schools. The National Defence University was subordinate directly to the Polish Ministry of National Education. AON was the alma mater of Polish commanding and staff officers and civilian experts in national and international security matters. It also conducted extensive scientific research on state defence issues, military doctrine, theory of warfare, military art, including military strategy, operational art and tactics, also in the field of national and international security. The National Defence University in Warsaw cooperated with the Polish Ministry of National Defence, General Staff, North Atlantic Treaty Organization and other Polish and foreign military, scientific and academic institutions.

The school's master's program was a five-years study program, but also AON provided two-years under- and over graduate study programs and four-years PhD (Doctor of Science) programs and higher doctorate (habilitation) opportunity as well.

History

Corps of Cadets

The present National Defence University inherits the traditions of all previous Polish military academies. The first such school, the Szkoła Rycerska, was founded in 1765 by King Stanisław August Poniatowski. Its graduates included some of the most notable military men of the 18th and 19th centuries, including Tadeusz Kościuszko, Jakub Jasiński, Maurycy Hauke, Julian Ursyn Niemcewicz, Karol Kniaziewicz, Józef Sowiński, Kazimierz Nestor Sapieha and Rajmund Rembieliński.

Artillery and Engineers School
In 1794, after the Partitions of Poland, the school was closed. However, after 1815 the recreation of the Kingdom of Poland allowed for opening several military colleges in Poland. The most notable, Szkoła Aplikacyjna Artylerii i Inżynierii (Artillery and Engineers School), was located in Warsaw and trained cadres of the Polish Army that fought in the November 1830 Uprising against Russia. Only some 24 officers were admitted each year,  making its graduates an elite of the Polish armed forces. The instructor in French language was Mikołaj Chopin, father of renowned composer Fryderyk Chopin. After the November Uprising, the school was closed by Russian authorities. However, military training of Polish officers continued in foreign schools, most notably in France and Italy.

The War College

Wyższa Szkoła Wojenna (English: War College—literally, "Higher War School") was the most important Polish military academy in the period between the World Wars. Located at Warsaw, it was established to train high-ranking officers of the Polish Army and of the armed forces of several allied states. It was a predecessor of Poland's present National Defense Academy (Polish: Akademia Obrony Narodowej).

After the rebirth of Poland in 1918, there was already a well-trained and experienced cadre of Polish field officers trained in the armies of the partitioners (Russia, Germany and Austria-Hungary) as well as in France. However, the occupants of Poland rarely promoted the Poles to higher ranks and the reborn Polish Army was seriously lacking officers trained in general staff duties and in command of entire armies. To eliminate the problem, in cooperation with the French Military Mission to Poland and the Paris-based École supérieure de guerre, a Szkoła Wojenna Sztabu Generalnego (War School of the General Staff) was formed in mid-1919.

After the Polish–Bolshevik War, on August 16, 1922, the school was renamed to Wyższa Szkoła Wojenna (WSW, Higher War School). Until 1928, most professors were French, with Polish officers serving mostly as their assistants. Among them was Charles de Gaulle, the future president of France, who was a professor of tactics. The training was not limited to military affairs and among the civilians working there were some of the most notable scientists of the era, including Tadeusz Kotarbiński, Edward Lipiński and Marian Kukiel. Apart from the theoreticians, the professors included a large number of officers who gained combat experience in World War I, Polish–Bolshevik War, Polish–Ukrainian War and Polish–Lithuanian War, as well as the Greater Poland Uprising and Silesian Uprisings. Because of their experience, the school became prestigious and attracted many students from abroad, most notably from France, Georgia, Estonia, Latvia and even Japan. Among them were also the officers of the former Ukrainian army of Semen Petlura and White Russian emigrees.

During the 20 years of its existence, the Wyższa Szkoła Wojenna trained more than 1300 officers of the Polish Army. Most of them repaid the debt for Poland during the Polish Defensive War of 1939, while the majority of professors formed the staff of Poznań Army, the most successful of Polish Armies in the 1939 campaign.

After Poland was overrun by Germany and the Soviet Union, the school was closed. However, on November 11, 1940, it was recreated in London. It trained the officers of the Polish Army in Exile, fighting alongside the Allies on all fronts of World War II. The professors were recruited from among the active officers of the Polish HQ and the students included many of the notable generals of the Polish forces in Exile. In addition, the school was the alma mater of all highest-ranking Czechoslovak officers of the exiled army. It was closed in 1946, after the Allies withdrew their support for the Polish government.

The War College in Exile 
The outbreak of World War II interrupted the activities of War College only for several months. Order of the Supreme Commander of 11 November 1940, resumed its activities initially in London (United Kingdom) and later in Scotland. To the War College in Exile were appointed officers – in ranks of lieutenants and captains. Students were also the Czechoslovak army officers. The purpose of education was to prepare personnel to serve in the brigade and division staffs of the Polish Armed Forces in the West. The program and methods of education were similar to those from the period War College in Warsaw. School received  establishment to the exercises, instructions and other normative documents from the British armed forces, allowing joint operations. School staff were officers of the Polish Commander of Staff. The activities of the War College in Exile was halted in July 1946. After the World War II, traditions of higher military education were continued in the Poland.

General Staff Academy

In 1947 a General Staff Academy was created. Its graduates have included Zygmunt Zieliński, Bolesław Chocha, Antoni Jasiński and Wojciech Jaruzelski.

Organizational units
 National Security Faculty
 Management and Command Faculty
 War Games and Simulation Center
 CBRN Defence Training Centre
 Officers Training Centre
 Foreign Languages Teaching Centre
 Physical Education and Shooting Training Branch
 Centre of International Cooperation
 Library
 Studies Organization Department
 Financial Office
 Human Resources Department
 Logistic Department
 Science and Research Branch
 Promotion of Education and Culture Branch
 Protection of Classified Information Branch
 Work Safety Section
 National Defence University Publishing House

Studies
Studies for officers:

Second degree studies (leading to a master's degree) in the following areas:
 National Security
 Economics
 Logistics
 Management with two specialisations: command and command of aviation National Security
Postgraduate studies and advanced courses:
 Post-graduate Defence Policy Studies
 Advanced Operational-Strategic Course
 Post-graduate Operational-Tactical Studies
 Post-graduate Air Force Command Studies

Studies for civilians:

Full-time and part-time first degree studies (leading to a bachelor's degree) and second degree studies (leading to a master's degree) in the following areas:
 National Security
 European Studies
 Logistics
 Management with two specialisations: Management and Command or Aviation Management
 History
Postgraduate studies in the field of:
 National Security
 Aviation Management
 Information Security Management
 Economic Systems Logistics
 Crisis Management
 International Military Relations
 Management in Military Staffs
 State's Economic Security
 Public Organizations Management
 Civil-Military Cooperation
 Management and Command in Multinational Organizations
 Education for Security
 Polemology – study of war and peace
 The Use of Force in Armed Conflicts
 Counter-Terrorism

Alumni
 Tadeusz Sapierzyński
 Roman Polko
 Andrzej Błasik
 Stanisław Targosz
 Zdzisław Żurawski
 Tadeusz Buk
 Kazimierz Gilarski
 Andrzej Karweta
 Włodzimierz Potasiński
 Jarosław Mika

See also
 List of Polish universities
 Indonesian Army Command and General Staff College
 National Defense Academy (Poland)

References

1765 establishments in the Polish–Lithuanian Commonwealth
Military academies of Poland
Staff colleges
Educational institutions established in 1947
Educational institutions established in 1990
Universities and colleges in Warsaw
1947 establishments in Poland
1990 establishments in Poland
Defunct military academies
Military education and training in Poland